Lord George John Manners (22 June 1820, in London – 8 September 1874, in Cheveley) was a British nobleman and Conservative Party politician who represented Cambridgeshire for over two decades, from 1847 to 1857 and from 1863 to 1874, when he died.

He was a younger son of John Manners, 5th Duke of Rutland by Lady Elizabeth Howard, daughter of Frederick Howard, 5th Earl of Carlisle. Charles Manners, 6th Duke of Rutland was his elder brother. He was educated at Trinity College, Cambridge, where he was a member of the University Pitt Club.  He married Lady Adeliza Matilda Fitzalan-Howard, daughter of Henry Fitzalan-Howard, 13th Duke of Norfolk, on 4 October 1855. They had five children: 
Cicely Elizabeth Adeliza Manners (21 November 1856 – 29 March 1949), died unmarried
Captain Charles George Edmund John Manners (26 September 1858 – 25 September 1911), died unmarried
Sir George Espec John Manners (17 June 1860 – 2 September 1939), married on 24 April 1884 Anna Gilstrap (d. 1940), died without issue
Frances Geraldine Manners (20 August 1864 – 6 March 1865)
Major Fitzalan George John Manners (27 February 1866 – 15 March 1901), unmarried, officer in the Scots Guards, died of enteric fever aboard SS Tagus during the Boer War

References

Descendants of Sir Robert Manners

External links 

1820 births
1874 deaths
Alumni of Trinity College, Cambridge
Conservative Party (UK) MPs for English constituencies
Younger sons of dukes
UK MPs 1847–1852
UK MPs 1852–1857
UK MPs 1859–1865
UK MPs 1865–1868
UK MPs 1868–1874
UK MPs 1874–1880
G